Halopropane (synonym FHD-3, trade name Tebron) is a halocarbon drug which was investigated as an inhalational anesthetic but was never marketed. Its clinical development was terminated due to a high incidence of cardiac arrhythmias in patients, similarly to the cases of teflurane and norflurane.

See also
 Aliflurane
 Roflurane
 Synthane

References

General anesthetics
Organobromides
Organofluorides
GABAA receptor positive allosteric modulators